Infosys Limited is an Indian multinational information technology company that provides business consulting, information technology and outsourcing services. The company was founded in Pune and is headquartered in Bangalore. Infosys is the second-largest Indian IT company, after Tata Consultancy Services, by 2020 revenue figures, and the 602nd largest public company in the world, according to the Forbes Global 2000 ranking.

On 24 August 2021, Infosys became the fourth Indian company to reach $100 billion in market capitalization.

History
Infosys was founded by seven engineers in Pune, Maharashtra, India. Its initial capital was $250. It was registered as Infosys Consultants Private Limited on 2 July 1981. In 1983, it relocated to Bangalore, Karnataka.

The company changed its name to Infosys Technologies Private Limited in April 1992 and to Infosys Technologies Limited when it became a public limited company in June 1992. It was renamed Infosys Limited in June 2011.

The IPO was undersubscribed but it was "bailed out" by US investment bank Morgan Stanley, which picked up a 13% equity stake at the offer price.

Infosys shares were listed on the Nasdaq stock exchange in 1999 as American depositary receipts (ADR). It became the first Indian company to be listed on Nasdaq. At that time, Infosys was among the 20 biggest companies by market capitalization on the Nasdaq. The ADR listing was shifted from Nasdaq to NYSE Euronext to give European investors better access to the company's shares.

In July 2010, then-British Prime Minister David Cameron visited Infosys HQ in Bangalore and addressed Infosys employees.

Its annual revenue reached US$100 million in 1999, US$1 billion in 2004 and US$10 billion in 2017.

In 2012, Infosys announced a new office in Milwaukee, Wisconsin, to serve Harley-Davidson. Infosys hired 1,200 United States employees in 2011 and expanded the workforce by 2,000 employees in 2012.
In April 2018, Infosys announced expansion in Indianapolis, Indiana.

In July 2014, Infosys started a product subsidiary called EdgeVerve Systems, focusing on enterprise software products for business operations, customer service, procurement and commerce network domains. In August 2015, assets from Finacle Global Banking Solutions were transferred from Infosys, thus becoming part of the product company EdgeVerve Systems' product portfolio.

Products and services
Infosys provides software development, maintenance and independent validation services to companies in finance, insurance, manufacturing and other domains.

Its key products and services are:
 NIA – Next Generation Integrated AI Platform (formerly known as Mana)
 Infosys Consulting – a global management consulting service
Cloud-based enterprise transformation services
 Infosys Information Platform (IIP), an analytics platform
 EdgeVerve Systems, which includes Finacle, a global banking platform
 Panaya Cloud Suite
 Skava (now Infosys Equinox)
Engineering Services
Digital Marketing

Geographical presence
Infosys has 82 sales and marketing offices and 123 development centres across the world as of 31 March 2018, with major presence in India, United States, China, Australia, Japan, Middle East and Europe.

In 2019, 60%, 24%, and 3% of its revenues were derived from projects in North America, Europe, and India, respectively. The remaining 13% of revenues were derived from the rest of the world.

In 2022, Infosys's presence in Russia came under scrutiny. Infosys issued a clarification stating that they don't have active relationships with Russian firms. By November, 2022; the only people working there were administrative staff helping with transferring the existing contracts to other contractors.

Acquisitions

Listing and shareholding pattern

In India, shares of Infosys are listed on the BSE where it is a part of the BSE SENSEX and the NSE where it is a NIFTY 50 Constituent. Its shares are listed by way of American depositary receipts (ADRs) at the New York Stock Exchange.

Over a period of time, the shareholding of its promoters has gradually reduced, starting from June 1993 when its shares were first listed. The promoters' holdings reduced further when Infosys became the first Indian-registered company to list Employees Stock Options Schemes and ADRs on NASDAQ on 11 March 1999. As of 29 July 2021, the promoter holding was 12.95%, foreign institutional investors (FIIs) hold 33.39%, and domestic institutional investors (DIIs) hold 21.98%.

Operations

Employees 
Infosys had a total of 259,619 employees (generally known as "Infoscions") as of 2021, out of which 38.6% were women. Out of its total workforce, 229,658 are software professionals and remaining 13,796 work for support and sales. In 2016, 89% of its employees were based in India.

During the financial year 2019, Infosys received 2,333,420 applications from prospective employees, interviewed 180,225 candidates and had a gross addition of 94,324 employees, a 4% hiring rate. These numbers do not include its subsidiaries.

In its Q3FY22 results in January, Infosys has reported that attrition has risen to 25.5%, from 20.1% in the September quarter. It has announced a profit of Rs 5,809 crore for the third quarter and said it is planning to hire 55,000 freshers for FY22 as part of its global graduate hiring program.

Training centre in Mysore

As the world's largest corporate university, the Infosys global education centre in the 337 acre campus has 400 instructors and 200+ classrooms, with international benchmarks at its core. Established in 2002, it had trained around 125,000 engineering graduates by June 2015. It can train 14,000 employees at a given point of time on various technologies.

The Infosys Leadership Institute (ILI), based in Mysore, has 196 rooms and trains about 4,000 trainees annually. Its purpose is to prepare and develop the senior leaders in Infosys for current and future executive leadership roles.

The Infosys Training Centre in Mysore also provides a number of extracurricular facilities like tennis, badminton, basketball, swimming pool, gym and bowling alley. It has an international level cricket ground approved by BCCI.

CEOs 
Since its establishment in 1981 until 2014 the CEOs of Infosys were its promoters, with N.R. Narayana Murthy leading the company in its initial 21 years. Dr. Vishal Sikka was the first non-promoter CEO; he held the position for around 3 years.  Sikka resigned in August 2017. After his resignation, UB Pravin Rao was appointed as Interim CEO and MD of the company. Infosys appointed Salil Parekh as chief executive officer (CEO) and managing director (MD) with effect from 2 January 2018.

List of Infosys CEOs

Awards and recognition 

 In 2021, Infosys was positioned as a leader in the Forrester Wave Application Modernization & Migration Services.
In 2021, Infosys was positioned as a Leader in Gartner Magic Quadrant for Data and Analytics Services.
In 2020, Infosys was ranked No. 1 in the HFS Top 10 Agile Software Development 2020 report.
 In 2020, Infosys was recognized as a leader in Retail and CPG Digital Services by Avasant.
 In 2019, Infosys was a winner of the United Nations Global Climate Action Award in 'Climate Neutral Now' category.
In 2019, Infosys was ranked as the 3rd Best Regarded Company in the World by Forbes.
 In 2017, HfS Research included Infosys in Winner's Circle of HfS Blueprint for Managed Security Services, Industry 4.0 services and Utility Operations.
 In 2013, Infosys was ranked 18th largest IT services provider in the world by HfS Research. In the same year, it was ranked 53rd in Forbes list of World's Most Innovative Companies.
 In 2012, Infosys was ranked  amongst the world's most innovative companies by Forbes. In the same year, Infosys was in the list of top twenty green companies in Newsweek Green Rankings for 2012.
 In 2006, Institute of Chartered Accountants of India included Infosys into Hall of Fame for being the winner of Best Presented Accounts for 11 consecutive years.

Controversies

Settlement of tax fraud in the US 
In December 2019, the Attorney General of California, Xavier Becerra announced an $800,000 settlement against Infosys and its BPM (business process management) subsidiary. Close to 500 Infosys employees were working in the state on Infosys-sponsored B-1 visas instead of H-1B visas between 2006 and 2017, as per an official post available on the website of State of California.

This misclassification resulted in Infosys avoiding California payroll taxes such as unemployment insurance, disability insurance, and employment training taxes.

Accusation of visa fraud in the US 
In 2011, Infosys was accused of committing visa fraud by using B-1 (visitor) visas for work requiring H-1B (work) visas. The allegations were initially made by an American employee of Infosys in an internal complaint. He subsequently sued the company, claiming that he was harassed and sidelined after speaking out. Although that case was dismissed it, along with another similar case, brought the allegations to the notice of the US authorities – and the U.S. Department of Homeland Security and a federal grand jury started investigating.

In October 2013, Infosys agreed to settle the civil suit with US authorities by paying US$34 million. Infosys refused to admit guilt and stressed that it only agreed to pay the fine to avoid the nuisance of "prolonged litigation". In its statement, the company said "As reflected in the settlement, Infosys denies and disputes any claims of systemic visa fraud, misuse of visas for competitive advantage, or immigration abuse. Those claims are assertions that remain unproven".

Allegations of financial irregularities 
In 2019, whistle blowers alleged irregularities in the company's financial accounting. Internal investigations conducted by the company concluded that the allegations were without merit. External auditors said that Infosys' approach to revenue recognition was in line with IAS 34 regulations.

Malfunctioning income tax, GST and MCA portal
From 2016 onwards, after Infosys took over the contract from Tata Consultancy Services stakeholders complained about malfunctioning and low performance of portals multiple times. The Income Tax portal went down on the due date of multiple tax periods and taxpayers ended up paying late fees and penalties, and the government allowed the extension of due dates because of this.

Chartered accountants and Company secretaries raised issues with MCA portal on due dates. Many companies became liable for additional fees and fines due to non-compliance. This issue is turning opposite to Ease of doing business initiatives of Government of India.

CAs and Tax professionals raised concerns about the flawed GST portal and their inability to rectify these issues.

Government faced severe criticism from CAs, CSs and other stakeholders for its continuous failure to take action against Infosys and alleged that public fund is being heavily mis-utilised.

See also
List of IT consulting firms
List of Indian IT companies
List of acquisitions by Infosys BPM Limited

References

External links

 

Infosys
Information technology consulting firms of India
International information technology consulting firms
Software companies of India
Outsourcing companies
Multinational companies headquartered in India
Technology companies established in 1981
Indian companies established in 1981
Information technology companies of Bangalore
Outsourcing in India
BSE SENSEX
NIFTY 50
Companies listed on the New York Stock Exchange
Indian brands
1981 establishments in Karnataka
Companies listed on the National Stock Exchange of India
Companies listed on the Bombay Stock Exchange